The Lares Ice Cream Parlor is an ice cream store located in the town of Lares, Puerto Rico.

The ice cream store was founded in 1968 by Salvador Barreto (known as "Yinyo") and has created over 200 flavors.

The ice cream store is located in front of the town square of Lares. It closed at the end of February 2014, due to the death of its founder and re-opened in March 2017. It is open 7 days a week and offers around 50 different ice cream flavors on a regular basis.

Influence

Another ice cream shop, is next door. After Hurricane Maria, some Puerto Rican expatriates opened similar shops in Central Florida.

See also
 List of Puerto Rico landmarks

References

External links
Article about the Ice Cream Store on Univision.
Article about the Ice Cream Store on Primera Hora. (In Spanish)
Reference about the Heladeria Lares on TravBuddy (In English)

Restaurants in Puerto Rico
Restaurants established in 1968
Ice cream parlors
1968 establishments in Puerto Rico